The Swan Inn is a Grade II listed former public house on the High Street (dating back to the 16th century in Ruislip, Middlesex. It is now a branch of the Café Rouge restaurant chain.

It was Grade II listed in 1974 by Historic England.

References

External links

Pubs in the London Borough of Hillingdon
Grade II listed pubs in London
Former pubs in London
Grade II listed buildings in the London Borough of Hillingdon